Holly Ward may refer to:

 Holly Ward (softball), American softball player
 Holly Ward (artist), Canadian interdisciplinary artist